Tony Gwynn Stadium is the home field of the San Diego State University Aztecs college baseball team. In addition, the San Diego Surf Dawgs of the independent Golden Baseball League used the park as their home field.

Stadium history
The original stadium was named Smith Field in honor of Charlie Smith, the longtime San Diego State head baseball coach. The stadium was demolished and rebuilt in 1997 at a cost of $4 million, funded largely thanks to a donation by John Moores, then owner of the San Diego Padres. The renovated stadium was named in honor of Tony Gwynn, a Hall of Fame superstar for the Padres. The playing field is still known as Charlie Smith Field.  As an undergraduate Gwynn played both baseball and basketball for the SDSU Aztecs. He became SDSU's head baseball coach after he retired from the Padres.

Facilities

The SDSU "Wall of Fame" is located just beyond the right field wall of the stadium.
Among the amenities contained within the stadium itself are the following:

Two concession stands and two sets of restrooms located behind the seating area on the plaza level. There is also a novelty/souvenir shop located on the outer concourse, featuring SDSU merchandise.

A coaches' dressing room and adjacent players' meeting room located at the east end of the first base stands to be used for team functions as well as a lounge for SDSU athletes

The Stephen and Mary Birch Baseball Museum located at the north end of the third base stand. The museum features numerous items relating to the history of baseball at San Diego State.

Home and visiting team locker rooms with shower facilities. There is also an umpires' dressing room for officials to use before and after games.

A training room with a Jacuzzi and dry sauna.

An equipment room with storage space for uniforms, baseballs, bats and other items.

A modern press box with booths for radio and television. A state-of-the-art public address system is operated from the press box as well as the stadium scoreboard. A hydraulic elevator is available to take media and VIPs from ground level to the press box.

Four sky boxes adjacent to the press box for visiting dignitaries and groups to view games.

There is an alumni lounge near the elevator on the ground floor that serves as reception area and hosts various functions. The room has been provided through the generosity of former Aztec pitcher Bud Black and his wife, Nan, who oversaw much of the work on the project herself.

Covered sunken team dugouts with tunnels adjacent to each that lead to the team locker rooms.

Two large batting/pitching cages located down the left and right field lines. Each cage has space for two indoor batting practice areas or may be used as a bull pen with two mounds during games. An auxiliary batting cage/storage building has been constructed down the right field. All of these cages are fully lit for night use. In addition, a new outdoor bullpen was installed down the left field line just prior to the 2004 season.

The Arch Krejci Barbecue/Picnic Area is available between the end of the permanent stands and the batting cage buildings down right field line. Named for an individual who has spent countless volunteer hours assisting the SDSU baseball program, this area is available for special events and group outings.

Ticket booths are located behind the stadium along the first base side as well as down the third base side to serve fans' needs at all games. 
Seating capacity of the stadium is 3,000, and that number could reach as high as 4,000 in the future. Of the 2,200 permanent seats installed during the initial phase of construction, 800 are armchair-style around the stadium at the field level. With the addition of new seating in May 2005, that number has increased to over 1,800, as more than 1,000 chair back seats were installed in the plaza level from first to third base. The remaining seats are composed of bleacher benches down both base lines. Additionally, bleachers seating are available behind the right field fence.

See also
 List of NCAA Division I baseball venues

References

External links
 Tony Gwynn Stadium home page

Baseball venues in California
College baseball venues in the United States
Minor league baseball venues
San Diego State Aztecs baseball
Sports venues in San Diego
Sports venues completed in 1997
1997 establishments in California